Hypena is a genus of moths in the family Erebidae. It was first described by Franz von Paula Schrank in 1802. These non-migratory moths overwinter as pupae and almost never estivate as adults.

Taxonomy
The genus includes the former Bomolocha species.

Description
Antennae minutely ciliated in male. An acute frontal tuft present. Thorax smoothly scaled. Abdomen with dorsal tufts. Mid and hind tibia slightly hairy. Forewings with acute and depressed apex.

Selected species
The following species are included in the genus. The lists may be incomplete.

Extant

Hypena abalienalis Walker, 1859 – white-lined hypena moth, white-lined bomolocha moth
Hypena abyssinalis Guénée, 1854
Hypena abyssinialis Guenée, 1854
Hypena albopunctalis (Leech, 1889)
Hypena amica (Bulter, 1878)
Hypena angustalis (Warren, 1913)
Hypena annulalis Grote, 1876
Hypena appalachiensis (Butler, 1987)
Hypena assimilis Hampson, 1891
Hypena atomaria (Smith, 1903)
Hypena baltimoralis Guénée, 1854 – Baltimore bomolocha moth or Baltimore hypena moth
Hypena bijugalis Walker, 1859 – dimorphic bomolocha moth, dimorphic hypena moth, or toothed snout moth
Hypena californica Behr, 1870
Hypena colombana Moore, [1885]
Hypena conscitalis Walker, 1866
Hypena cowani Viette, 1968
Hypena crassalis (Fabricius, 1787) – beautiful snout moth
Hypena cruca (Strand, 1920)
Hypena cyanea (Hampson, 1893)
Hypena deceptalis Walker, 1859 – deceptive hypena moth
Hypena decorata J. B. Smith, 1884
Hypena degesalis Walker, 1859
Hypena denticulata (Moore, 1882)
Hypena depalpis Strand, 1920
Hypena desquamata (Strand, 1920)
Hypena dichromialis Strand, 1920
Hypena ducalis Schaus & Clemens, 1893
Hypena edictalis Walker, 1859 – large bomolocha moth
Hypena eductalis Walker, 1859
Hypena erikae Lödl, 1994
Hypena euryzostra Turner, 1932
Hypena extensa Walker, [1866]
Hypena furva Wileman, 1911
Hypena fuscomaculalis Saalmüller, 1880
Hypena gonospilalis Walker, 1866
Hypena griseapex Hampson, 1891
Hypena griveaudi Viette, 1968
Hypena gypsospila Turner, 1903
Hypena hemiphaea de Joannis, 1915
Hypena heuloa (Smith, 1905)
Hypena hoareae Holloway, 1977
Hypena humuli Harris, 1841 – hop looper moth or hop vine moth
Hypena iconicalis Walker, 1859
Hypena incognata Bethune-Baker, 1908
Hypena indicatalis Walker, 1859
Hypena indistincta Wileman, 1915
Hypena isogona Meyrick, 1889
Hypena jocosalis Walker, [1859]
Hypena jusssalis (Walker, 1859)
Hypena kanshireiensis Wileman, 1916
Hypena kingdoni Viette, 1968
Hypena labatalis Walker, 1859
Hypena laceratalis Walker, [1859] – lantana defoliator moth
Hypena lignealis Walker, 1866
Hypena lividalis (Hübner, 1796)
Hypena longipennis Walker, 1866
Hypena madefactalis Guénée, 1854 – gray-edged hypena moth or gray-eyed bomolocha moth
Hypena malagasy (Viette, 1968)
Hypena manalis Walker, 1859 – flowing-line hypena moth
Hypena mandatalis Walker, 1859
Hypena minualis Guénée, 1854 – sooty bomolocha moth
Hypena modestoides Poole, 1989 (=Hypena modesta J. B. Smith, 1895)
Hypena molpusalis Walker, 1859
Hypena munitalis Mann, 1861
Hypena namaqualis Guenée, 1854
Hypena napa Strand, 1920
Hypena napana Strand, 1920
Hypena nasutalis Guenée, 1854
Hypena neoeductalis Lafontaine & Schmidt, 2010 (=Hypena (Bomolocha) eductalis Hampson, 1895)
Hypena neoplyta Prout, 1925
Hypena obacerralis Walker, 1859 
Hypena obesalis Treitschke, 1828 – Paignton snout moth
Hypena obfuscalis Hampson, 1893
Hypena obsitalis (Hübner, 1813) – Bloxworth snout moth
Hypena obsoleta Butler, 1877
Hypena occata Hampson, 1882
Hypena ophiusinalis Mabille, 1879
Hypena ophiusoides Moore, 1882
Hypena opulenta (Christoph, 1877)
Hypena orthographa Turner, 1932
Hypena palpalis (Hübner, 1796)
Hypena palparia Walker, 1861 – variegated snout moth or mottled bomolocha moth
Hypena parva (Wileman, 1916)
Hypena pelodes Turner, 1932
Hypena perspicua (Leech, 1900)
Hypena peterseni Strand, 1920
Hypena poa Strand, 1920
Hypena polycyma Hampson, 1902
Hypena porrectalis Fabricius, 1794
Hypena proboscidalis (Linnaeus, 1758) – snout moth
Hypena quaesitalis Walker, 1859
Hypena ramstadtii (Wyatt, 1967)
Hypena rostralis (Linnaeus, 1758) – buttoned snout moth
Hypena sabinis Lödl, 1994
Hypena saltalis Schaus & Clemens, 1893
Hypena satsumalis Leech, 1889
Hypena scabra (Fabricius, 1798) – green cloverworm moth or black snout moth
Hypena simplex (Lucas, 1895)
Hypena sinuosa Wileman, 1911
Hypena sordidula Grote, 1872 – sordid hypena moth
Hypena strigata (Fabricius)
Hypena strigatus (Fabricius, 1798)
Hypena striolalis Aurivillius, 1910
Hypena subcyanea Butler, 1881
Hypena subidalis Guenée, 1854
Hypena subvittalis Walker, 1866
Hypena sylpha Butler, 1887
Hypena taiwana (Wileman, 1915)
Hypena tenebralis (Strand, 1920)
Hypena toyi (Viette, 1968)
Hypena trigonalis (Guenee, 1854)
Hypena tristalis Lederer, 1853
Hypena umbralis (Smith, 1884)
Hypena variabilis Druce, 1890
Hypena varialis Walker, 1866
Hypena vega (Smith, 1900)
Hypena veronikae Lödl, 1994
Hypena verticalis Hampson, 1910
Hypena vestita (Moore, [1885])
Hypena vetustalis Guénée, 1854
Hypena zillana Strand, 1920

Species brought into synonymy
 Hypena masurialis: synonym of Rhynchina obliqualis (Kollar, 1844)
 Hypena obliqualis: synonym of Rhynchina obliqualis (Kollar, 1844)
 Hypena sagitta: synonym of Dichromia sagitta (Fabricius, 1775)

Extinct
 Laysan dropseed noctuid moth (Hypena laysanensis)
 Hilo noctuid moth (Hypena newelli)
 Lovegrass noctuid moth (Hypena plagiota)
 Kaholuamano noctuid moth (Hypena senicula)

References

External links
 
 

 
Hypeninae
Noctuoidea genera
Taxonomy articles created by Polbot